Lola Brooks is an American artist and educator specializing in jewelry. Brooks' work has been shown at venues such as the National Ornamental Metal Museum, The Society of Arts and Crafts, Cleveland Museum of Natural History, Museum of Craft and Folk Art, and Talente and held in the permanent collection of The Museum of Art and Design, the Metropolitan Museum of Art.

Education 
Brooks received her bachelor's degree in Fine Arts from SUNY New Paltz where she studied with Jamie Bennett and Myra Mimlitsch-Gray.

Career 
Brooks currently serves as visiting faculty at Cranbrook Academy of Art for 2015–2016 in Metalsmithing. Brooks was previously the Lamar Dodd Professorial Chair at the University of Georgia, and has also taught at the Rhode Island School of Design, the University of the Arts, and SUNY New Paltz, as well as the 92nd St Y in New York City, Haystack Mountain School of Crafts, and Penland School of Crafts.

In April 2021, she held a solo exhibition, story of the eye: a subculture of ornamental oddities, at Sienna Patti Contemporary.

Artwork 
Brooks' studio jewelry combines Victorian sentimental jewelry, Berlin Iron Jewelry, twentieth-century costume jewelry, hip hop "bling" culture, tattoos, American road trip culture, and cultural signifiers of love and femininity. 

Ashley Callahan for Ornament Magazine describes her artwork:

 Brooks' jewelry is luxurious excess. The scale is often large, though always unquestionably wearable. Brooches, necklaces, rings, and bracelets feature multitudes of glittering stones, hordes of antique ivory roses or tarnished steel bows, and mounds of faceted steel balls. She mixes high and low, setting diamonds next to quartz, and upends expected uses of materials, soldering steel with gold. She is devoted to the traditions of metalsmithing and relishes the technical challenges that each new object presents.

Brooks' adherence to the format of jewelry is important in her studio practice. She explains her interest in the format of jewelry in an interview for the American Craft Council "I believe in the power of jewelry's intimate scale and symbiotic reliance on the body, and the fact that its beauty and materiality have always been poisoned by a shameless celebration of wealth, excess, and debaucheries. I love that it becomes inextricably tied into how we cultivate identity."

Along with her high-end art jewelry, Brooks also maintains a more traditional jewelry line.

Public collections
 Yale Art Gallery, New Haven, CT
 The Samuel Dorsky Museum, New Paltz, NY; 
 The Racine Museum of Art, Racine, Wisconsin
 The Museum of Art and Design 
 Metropolitan Museum of Art in New York City

Selected Grants/Recognition/Residencies
 2012-2013 Lamar Dodd Professional Chair, Lamar Dodd School of Art, University of Georgia
 2012 RISD Part Time Faculty Association Development Fund Grant, Rhode Island School of Design Part-time Faculty Association	
 2001 Emerging Artist Award, Sienna Gallery, Lenox, Massachusetts

References

1970 births
American artists
Living people
State University of New York at New Paltz alumni